The 2001 Finnish Cup was the 47th season of the main annual association football cup competition in Finland. It was organised as a single-elimination knock–out tournament and participation in the competition was voluntary.  A total of 274 teams registered for the competition.  The final was held at the Tammela Stadion, Tampere on 12 November 2001 with Atlantis FC defeating Tampere United by 1-0 before an attendance of 3,820 spectators.

Teams

Preliminary round

Round 1

Round 2

Round 3

Round 4

Round 5

Round 6

Quarter-finals

Semi-finals

Final

References

External links
 Suomen Cup Official site 

Finnish Cup seasons
Finnish Cup, 2001
Finnish Cup, 2001